GED Connection is a television program on PBS that provides instruction on how to pass the General Educational Development (GED) test. It is part of an instructional course that also includes workbooks and practice tests. GED Connection is part of a larger program called LiteracyLink created by PBS, Kentucky Educational Television, the National Center on Adult Literacy, and the Kentucky Department of Education.

External links
GED Connection page on LiteracyLink website

 

PBS original programming
Adult education television series
Kentucky Educational Television